After the Shock is a made-for-television movie about the aftermath of the 1989 Loma Prieta earthquake that hit San Francisco on October 17, 1989.

Cast

Jack Scalia as Jack Thompson
Yaphet Kotto as William McElroy
Tuck Milligan as Terry Brown
Richard Anthony Crenna as Patrick Wallace
Rue McClanahan as Sherra Cox
Paul Ben-Victor as Dr. Steven Brattesani
Michael Clark as Capt. Bob Boudoures
Gary Swanson as Lt. Pete Cornyn 
Scott Valentine as Gerry Shannon
Brian Thompson as Tom
Charlotte Crossley as Mother with Child
Carlease Burke as Screaming Woman
Clinton Derricks-Carroll as Neighbor

Awards
The film was nominated for the Outstanding Achievement in Choreography Emmy Award.

References

External links

1990 television films
1990 films
Disaster television films
1990s disaster films
Films set in San Francisco
Films about earthquakes
Films set in 1989
Films directed by Gary Sherman
USA Network original films
American disaster films
Disaster films based on actual events
Drama films based on actual events
American drama television films
1990s English-language films
Paramount Pictures films
1990s American films
English-language drama films